Mevan Fernando (born 16 March 1981) is a Sri Lankan cricketer. He played 56 first-class and 46 List A matches between 2002 and 2011. He made his Twenty20 debut on 17 August 2004, for Tamil Union Cricket and Athletic Club in the 2004 SLC Twenty20 Tournament. He was also part of Sri Lanka's squad for the 2000 Under-19 Cricket World Cup.

References

External links
 

1981 births
Living people
Sri Lankan cricketers
Seeduwa Raddoluwa Cricket Club cricketers
Tamil Union Cricket and Athletic Club cricketers
People from Negombo